The Federation of Civil Service Unions (FCSU/FSCC) is one of two primary trade union affiliates of the National Trade Unions Confederation in Mauritius.

Trade unions in Mauritius